A compote is a dish made from game meat.  Some examples of the game meat used are rabbit, partridge and pigeon. The meat is cooked in a roux for a long time over low heat along with pearl onions and bacon added at the end. The dish is cooked until the meat has a fine texture and has completely fallen from the bones.

References

Meat dishes
Stews
Rabbit dishes